Joaquim Manoel Guedes Sobrinho (June 18, 1932 in São Paulo – July 27, 2008 in São Paulo) was a Brazilian architect and urban planner. Praised as one of the most important architects of his generation, he was known for rejecting formalism in favor of an architecture that responds to the needs of everyday life. Although usually associated with the Paulista School, Guedes was a critic of Oscar Niemeyer and mainstream Brazilian architecture and thus considered an 'enfant terrible' among many of his colleagues.

He inaugurated his practice in São Paulo in 1955 and worked on over 400 projects. He is best known for his single-family houses and urban projects, among them the new town of Caraíba in the State of Bahia, Brazil.

Bibliography
Junqueira, M. Joaquim Guedes. São Paulo: Cosac & Naify, 2000.
Brazil's Modern Architecture, Edited by Elisabetta Andreoli and Adrian Fort. London: Phaidon Press, 2004.

1932 births
2008 deaths
Brazilian architects